Sphinctospermum is a genus of flowering plants in the legume family, Fabaceae. It belongs to the subfamily Faboideae. It is a monotypic genus, containing the single species Sphinctospermum constrictum. It is native to North America, where it occurs in Mexico and Arizona in the southwestern United States. The plant is known by the common name hourglass peaseed.

This species occurs in grasslands and dry forests. It grows in sandy soils and is more common in wet years.

References

External links
Sphictospermum. The Plant List.

Further reading
Lavin, M. 1990. The genus Sphinctospermum (Leguminosae): Taxonomy and tribal relationships as inferred from a cladistic analysis of traditional data. Systematic Botany Vol. 15, No. 4 pp. 544-559

Robinieae
Monotypic Fabaceae genera